Aniyathi (ml; അനിയത്തി) (English: Younger Sister) is an Indian television series which launched on the channel Mazhavil Manorama. The show stars Meera Muraleedharan and Gowri Krishna in the leading roles. It replaced the series Pattu Saree, and ended on 20 February 2015 after running for 152 episodes.

Plot 
The story revolves around a traditional family settled in Kerala with parents Sathyaprakash Menon and Prabha, and focuses on the trials and tribulations faced by sisters Gayathri and Gowri. The lives of the sisters get more complicated when elder daughter Gayathri finds herself in a challenging situation.

The story ends when Gowri and Gayathri overcome all their problems and Gayathri marries her lover Alan Joseph. Shortly after this Gowri is diagnosed with cancer, a great shock to all those who love her. However, this does not stop her from fighting for what is right.

In the final episode Gowri travels abroad for medical treatment, and her family and friends await her safe return.

Cast

Main Cast 
 Gowri Krishnan as Gowri Shankar
 Meera Muralidharan as Gayathri Alan

Additional Cast 

 Shaji Thilakan as Pookadan Paulose
 Santhosh Sasidharan as Sunny Paulose Pookadan
 Sarath Das as Alan Joseph
 Ambareesh as Sankar
 Sayana as Sayana Paulose Pookadan
 Bijoy Varghese as Benny Paulose Pookadan
 Indulekha as Susan Benny
 Bindhu Varapuzha as Annamma Paulose
 Vijayakumari
 Amritha Varnan
 Parvathi T
 Subbalakshmi
 Santhosh Kurup
 Sreekala
 Ibrahim Kutty
 Devi Chandana
 Ranjith Raj
 Kavitha as Circle Inspector

Earlier Cast
 Rizabawa as Sathyaprakash Menon
 Reena as Prabha Menon

References 

2014 Indian television series debuts
Malayalam-language television shows
Mazhavil Manorama original programming